Juksan Ahn clan is one of the Korean clans. Their Bon-gwan was in Anseong, Gyeonggi Province. According to the research held in 2015, the number of Juksan Ahn clan’s member was 77026. Their founder was  who was a I Won’s eldest son, and came to Silla from Tang dynasty in 807. Then,  was settled in Silla and founded Juksan Ahn clan.

See also 
 Korean clan names of foreign origin

References

External links 
 

 
Korean clan names of Chinese origin
An clans
Clans based in Gyeonggi Province